Kolbaşı is a village in the Yüksekova District of Hakkâri Province in Turkey. The village had a population of 231 in 2022. The hamlet of Ormanarası is attached to Kolbaşı.

History 
The village was populated by 20 Assyrian families in 1850 and 12 families in 1877.

Population 
Population history from 2000 to 2022:

References 

Villages in Yüksekova District
Kurdish settlements in Hakkâri Province
Historic Assyrian communities in Turkey